Mark Ralph may refer to:
 Mark Ralph (field hockey) (born 1980), Scottish field hockey midfield player
 Mark Ralph (record producer) (born 1974), British record producer